Antonie is a given name with several origins and uses.

In the Dutch language, it is a masculine name derived from Antonius. It is used in areas where Dutch and Afrikaans are spoken. 

In Czech, Danish, German, Norwegian, and Swedish, it is a feminine name cognate to Antonia.

In Romanian, it is a masculine name.

Notable persons with the name include:

Masculine name
Antonie, Lord of Monaco (died 1427)
Antonie Augustus Bruijn (1842–1890), Dutch navy officer and naturalist
Antonie Claassen (born 1984), South African rugby player
Antonie Dixon (1968–2009), New Zealand criminal
Antonie de Gee (1872–1940), Dutch sports shooter
Antonie Gerrits (1885–1969), Dutch cyclist
Antonie Marinus Harthoorn (1923–2012), Dutch-born South African veterinarian and environmentalist
Antonie Iorgovan (1948–2007), Romanian jurist, professor and politician
Antonie Kamerling (1966–2010), Dutch actor and musician
Antonie van Leeuwenhoek (1632-1723), Dutch scientist
Antonie Aris van de Loosdrecht (1885–1917), Dutch Protestant missionary on Sulawesi
Antonie Misset (1901–1974), Dutch wrestler
Antonie Frederik Jan Floris Jacob van Omphal (1788–1863), Dutch lieutenant-general
Antonie Pannekoek (1873–1960), Dutch astronomer, Marxist theorist, and social revolutionary
Antonie Sminck Pitloo (1790–1837), Dutch landscape painter
Antonie Plămădeală (1926–2005), Romanian bishop
Antonie Vodă din Popești (f.1669–1672), Ruler of Wallachia
Antonie Schouten (born 1946), Canadian field hockey player 
Antonie Viljoen (1858–1918), Afrikaner liberal politician
Antonie Waterloo (1609–1690), Dutch landscape painter
Antonie Frederik Zürcher (1825–1876), Dutch painter, draughtsman, etcher and art teacher

Feminine name
Antonie Adamberger (1790–1867), Austrian stage actress
Antonie Barth (1871-1956), Bavarian actress and wife of Ludwig Wilhelm, Duke in Bavaria
Antonie Brentano (1780–1869), Austrian philanthropist, art collector, and arts patron
Antonie Hegerlíková (1923–2012), Czech actress
Antonie Jaeckel (1876–1960), German actress
Antonie Langendorf (1894–1969), German political activist and politician 
Antonie Nedošinská (1885–1950), Czech film actress
Antonie Rädler (1899–1991), German mystic and neo-revelationist
Antonie Stemmler (1892–1976), German teacher, nurse and member of the fascist resistance
Antonie Strassmann (1901–1952), German stage actress and aviator

See also

Anthonie, Dutch given name practically interchangeable with Antonie
Antonee
Antonic
Antonije
Antonik
Antonin (name)
Antonine (name)
Antoniu
Antony (disambiguation)

Notes

Dutch masculine given names
German feminine given names
Romanian masculine given names